Perfect Day is a European Lou Reed compilation.

Track listing
 "Rock And Roll Heart"
 "Perfect Day"
 "Coney Island Baby"
 "Men of Good Fortune"
 "How Do You Speak to an Angel"
 "Downtown Dirt"
 "Real Good Time Together"
 "Vicious Circle"
 "A Gift"
 "Think It Over"
 "My Friend George"
 "Legendary Hearts"
 "The Last Shot"
 "Leave Me Alone"
 "Temporary Thing"
 "The Gun"
 "Sad Song"
 "Growing Up in Public"

Lou Reed compilation albums
1997 compilation albums